Below is a list of railway stations in Paris, France, current and historical.

Active stations

Major lines

These stations are the terminal stations of major lines (trains going beyond the Île-de-France region), and, except for Bercy, the suburban Transilien lines. Austerlitz, Saint-Lazare, Lyon and Nord are also stations on the RER network. All stations connect to stations of the Paris Métro.

 Gare d'Austerlitz:
 trains to central France, Toulouse and the Pyrenees
  
 Lunéa night train
 Gare de Bercy:
 trains to southeastern France
 Gare de l'Est:
 trains to eastern France, Germany, and Switzerland
  
   (via Magenta station)
 Gare de Lyon:
 trains to southeastern France and Languedoc-Roussillon
 TGV Sud-Est, Rhône-Alpes and Méditerranée, to Spain, Switzerland (TGV Lyria) and Italy
 Frecciarossa to Italy
  
  
  
 Gare Montparnasse:
 trains to western and southwestern France
 TGV Ouest and LGV Atlantique
  
 Gare du Nord:
 trains to northern France
 LGV Nord to Lille-Europe
 Thalys to Belgium, the Netherlands, and Germany
 Eurostar to London
  
  
   (via Magenta station)
  
  
 Gare Saint-Lazare:
 trains to Normandy
  
  
   (via Haussmann–Saint-Lazare station)

Suburban lines

RER stations
The stations of major lines (the preceding section) which are also stations of the RER are not included. These stations are used only by the RER lines designated.

 Auber 
 Avenue Foch 
 Avenue Henri Martin 
 Avenue du Président Kennedy 
 Bibliothèque François Mitterrand 
 Boulainvilliers 
 Champ-de-Mars – Tour Eiffel 
 Charles de Gaulle–Étoile 
 Châtelet–Les Halles    
 Cité Universitaire 
 Denfert-Rochereau 
 Haussmann–Saint-Lazare 
 Invalides 
 Javel 
 Luxembourg 
 Magenta 
 Musée d'Orsay 
 Nation 
 Neuilly – Porte Maillot 
 Pereire - Levallois 
 Pont de l'Alma 
 Pont du Garigliano 
 Port-Royal 
 Porte de Clichy 
 Saint-Michel – Notre-Dame

Transilien stations 
 Pont Cardinet

Stations no longer used

Chemin de fer de Petite Ceinture 
The Chemin de fer de Petite Ceinture is a line which circled Paris which is no longer in use. The majority of the stations on this line have been abandoned, though some have been reused.

From the west clockwise, the stations are:

Former Ouest company "Paris à Auteuil" line
 Auteuil-Boulogne
 Passy-la-Muette
 Avenue Henri Martin (now used by RER C)
 Avenue du Bois-de-Boulogne (now used by RER C)
 Neuilly-Maillot (now used by RER C)
 Courcelles-Levallois (now used by RER C)

Former rail-company syndicate "Chemin de fer de Ceinture (Rive Droite)"
 Avenue de Clichy (now used by RER C)
 Avenue de Saint-Ouen
 Boulevard Ornano
 La Chapelle-Saint-Denis
 L’Évangile (formerly Gare de la Chapelle), disused classification yard
 Ménilmontant
 Pont de Flandres
 Belleville-Villette, also freight station
 Charonne, also freight station
 Rue d'Avron
 Avenue de Vincennes
 Bel-Air Ceinture
 Rue Claude Decaen
 Bercy-Ceinture
 La Rapée-Bercy, disused classification yard
 Orléans-Ceinture

Former Ouest company "Chemin de fer de Ceinture (Rive Gauche)"
 Maison Blanche
 Parc de Montsouris
 Montrouge
 Ouest ceinture
 Abattoirs de Vaugirard, specially for livestock
 Vaugirard Ceinture
 Point-du-Jour

Other stations 
 Gare du boulevard Masséna, on RER C, closed December 3, 2000 because it was replaced by Bibliothèque François Mitterrand.

Abandoned or destroyed stations 
 Gare de la Bastille on the former line Paris-Vincennes, demolished to construct the Opéra Bastille
 Gare de Reuilly on the former line Paris-Vincennes
 Gare d'Orsay, converted into the Musée d’Orsay
 Gare de Paris-Bestiaux, abandoned
 Gare de Paris-Gobelins, former freight station, under pavement, visible from the south of Rue Nationale
 Gare de La Glacière-Gentilly
 Gare de Grenelle-marchandises
 Gare du Champ de Mars from the Exposition Universelle of 1878, moved in 1897 to Asnières-sur-Seine (Gare des Carbonnets), threatened by ruin despite being listed as a historic monument since 1985.

See also
 List of Paris Métro stations
 List of RER stations
 List of Transilien stations
 Société Nationale des Chemins de fer Français

Sources
This page has been translated from the article :fr:Liste de gares de Paris on the French Wikipedia, accessed on August 29, 2006.

External links
 RATP – Journey planner of RATP (all Stations - official RATP web site in English)

 
Paris
Railway stations